The Beatles Anthology is a multimedia retrospective project consisting of a television documentary, a three-volume set of double albums, and a book describing the history of the Beatles. Beatles members Paul McCartney, George Harrison and Ringo Starr participated in the making of the works, which are sometimes referred to collectively as the Anthology project, while John Lennon appears in archival interviews.

The documentary series was first broadcast in November 1995, with expanded versions released on VHS and LaserDisc in 1996 and on DVD in 2003. The documentary used interviews with the Beatles and their associates to narrate the history of the band as seen through archival footage and performances. The Anthology book, released in 2000, paralleled the documentary in presenting the group's history through quotes from interviews.

The initial volume of the album set (Anthology 1) was released the same week of the documentary's airdate, with the subsequent two volumes (Anthology 2 and Anthology 3) released in 1996. They included unreleased performances and outtakes presented in roughly chronological order, along with two new songs based on demo tapes recorded by Lennon after the group broke up: "Free as a Bird" and "Real Love", both produced by Jeff Lynne.

Documentary series

Approximately coinciding with the release of the "Free as a Bird" single and Anthology 1 album (the first of three double-CD albums), The Beatles Anthology series of documentaries was broadcast on ITV in the United Kingdom and ABC television in the United States in 1995. The Anthology series takes a form similar to that of the Anthology book, by being a series of first-person accounts by the Beatles themselves, with no external "objective" narration.  Footage in the Anthology series features voice-over recordings of all four Beatles to push the narrative of the story, with contributions from their producer, road manager and others. As well as telling their story through archival footage, Paul McCartney, George Harrison and Ringo Starr appear in interview segments recorded exclusively for the series; John Lennon appears only in historic archival footage.

The series, which included over 5000 hours of planning and production, is composed of numerous film clips and interviews that present a complete history of the band from the Beatles' own personal perspectives. When it aired on ABC, the series comprised six hour-long programs, aired on three nights in November 1995. The series was later released as eight expanded episodes on VHS, laserdisc and as a boxed set of five DVDs (4 discs with 2 episodes apiece and a disc of extras).

Air dates on ABC:

 Sunday, 19 November 1995: 9–11 p.m.
 Wednesday, 22 November 1995: 9–11 p.m.
 Thursday, 23 November 1995: 9–11 p.m.

Part 1 of the series drew 17 million households, meaning an average of 27.3 million viewers, which was much better than usual for ABC at the time, but behind most broadcasts of Friends on NBC, which in its second season was averaging 29.4 million viewers per episode.

In promoting the series, ABC identified itself as "A-Beatles-C" – an homage to the mid-1960s "77 W-A-Beatles-C" call sign of the network's flagship NYC AM radio station – and several of the network's prime-time sitcoms replaced their regular opening credit themes with Beatles tracks.

Albums

To accompany the Anthology series, three albums were issued, each containing two CDs, two cassette tapes or three vinyl LPs of mostly never-before-released Beatles material (the exceptions being the Tony Sheridan-era material), although many of the tracks had appeared on bootlegs for many years prior.

Two days after the first television special in the series had aired, Anthology 1 was released to stores, and included music recorded by the Quarrymen, the famous Decca Records audition tapes, and various out-takes and demos from the band's first four albums. It also included the song "Lend Me Your Comb", omitted from the collection Live at the BBC, released the previous year (1994). The song "Free as a Bird" was included at the very start. Some 450,000 copies of Anthology 1 were sold in its first day of release, the most sales for an album in a single day ever. The band's first drummer Pete Best, replaced by Ringo Starr in 1962 before the Beatles recorded professionally for EMI, received his first substantial Beatles royalties from this album, for the inclusion of early demo tracks on which he played.

Anthology 2 was released on 17 March 1996. The second collection presented out-takes and demos from the Beatles' sessions for Help!, Rubber Soul, Revolver, Sgt. Pepper's Lonely Hearts Club Band and Magical Mystery Tour. These included selected early demos and takes for Lennon's "Strawberry Fields Forever", previously available only to bootleg collectors. The new song "Real Love" – which, like "Free as a Bird", was based on an unfinished Lennon recording – was also included in the two-CD collection.

Anthology 3 was released on 28 October 1996. The third collection featured out-takes and demos from The Beatles ("White Album"), Abbey Road and Let It Be, as well as several songs from Harrison and McCartney which later became post-Beatle tracks.

Collage

The three album covers, when laid side-by-side, become one long painted collage of various peeling posters and album covers representing the different stages of the Beatles' career. This was the work of Klaus Voormann, who also created the album cover for Revolver in 1966. The Anthology covers required Voormann to recreate elements of his cover for Revolver within the collage. During the music video for "Free as a Bird", the Anthology collage appears as posters on a shop window as the camera pans quickly across the street. The design also adorned the VHS, laserdisc and DVD releases, again to be properly encountered by laying the cases side by side.  Upon the release of Anthology 3, HMV stores made available a limited edition cardboard sleeve designed to hold all three CD volumes of which each side of the sleeve make up half of the collage.

Digital release and Anthology Highlights
All three albums were made digitally available on the iTunes Store on 14 June 2011, alongside a new Anthology Highlights album which featured a selection of tracks from all three albums and reached number 184 on Billboard's United States Top Current Albums chart.

Anthology Highlights track listing
"Free as a Bird" – 4:25
"One After 909" (Complete) – 2:55
"That Means a Lot" – 2:26
"Leave My Kitten Alone" – 2:56
"If You've Got Trouble" – 2:48
"Can't Buy Me Love" – 2:10
"Mr. Moonlight" – 2:47
"Kansas City / Hey-Hey-Hey-Hey!" – 2:46
"Eight Days a Week" (Complete) – 2:47
"I'm Looking Through You" – 2:53
"Yesterday" – 2:34
"Tomorrow Never Knows" (Take 1) – 3:14
"Strawberry Fields Forever" (Take 1) – 2:34
"Across the Universe" (Take 2) – 3:30
"Something" – 3:18
"Not Guilty" – 3:22
"Octopus's Garden" – 2:49
"All Things Must Pass" – 3:04
"Come and Get It" – 2:30
"Good Night" – 2:38
"While My Guitar Gently Weeps" – 3:27
"The Long and Winding Road" – 3:41
"Real Love" – 3:54

Book

In October 2000, The Beatles Anthology book was released, which included interviews with all four band members and others involved, plus rare photos. Many of the interviews quoted are from those featured in the documentary films. The book is designed as a large-format hardback, with imaginative artwork throughout, and several visually vibrant and colourful spreads featuring graphics relevant to the proceeding chronology, photographic arrays and a variety of text styles and layouts. The book went straight to the top of The New York Times bestsellers list. In 2002, the book was released as a large-format paperback.

Unreleased recordings

During early 1995, as work on The Beatles Anthology continued, Yoko Ono and McCartney recorded an avant-garde piece called "Hiroshima Sky Is Always Blue". Ono provided vocals and McCartney played bass, while Sean Lennon, Linda McCartney, and McCartney's children played various instruments. The piece was broadcast on Japanese public television in memory of the 50th anniversary of the atomic bombing of Hiroshima.

The track "Carnival of Light", recorded during the Sgt. Pepper's Lonely Hearts Club Band sessions, was intended to be released on the Anthology 2 album, but was vetoed by George Harrison.

It was reported that McCartney, Harrison and Starr worked on a new composition called "All for Love" in March 1995, intended as a track on Anthology 3, but the effort was abandoned. No version of the song has reached the public.

Promotional items
Each of the three Anthology albums was accompanied by a promotional CD sampler sent to radio stations shortly before the official release dates. These CDs have since become highly sought collector's items. Even rarer is a vinyl version of the sampler for Anthology 2, which was only sent to college radio stations and featured a different cover (though the contents were the same).

In October 1996 there was a strictly limited release from EMI, a slip case cover to house all three CD volumes, which have since become extremely rare, fetching high prices among collectors.

Parodies

The success of the Anthology albums was parodied by the release of the Rutles' Archaeology some months later. Delays in the release of the third volume of the Beatles' series ultimately meant that the Rutles' parody arrived in shops on the same day as its inspiration.

"Weird Al" Yankovic parodied The Beatles Anthology in an Al TV special. He said he had a copy of a fictional Anthology 17, which he claimed would not be available to the public for a while. He played for the audience a track of Paul McCartney brushing his teeth and Ringo Starr shaving before The Ed Sullivan Show.

The Beatles Anthology was also parodied on the short-lived Dana Carvey Show, which was being aired on ABC around the same time that Anthology was being televised on the network.

On Late Night with Conan O'Brien the host had the remaining Beatles adding music and doing backup singing to a fictitious vocal track of John Lennon's answering machine message.

References

 
1960s in music
British music history
Mass media franchises
Grammy Award for Best Long Form Music Video
Chronicle Books books
Anthologies